Breimsvatn or Breimsvatnet is a lake in the municipalities of Gloppen and Sunnfjord in Vestland county, Norway. At , it is the largest lake in Gloppen (followed by the lake Emhjellevatnet). The European route E39 highway runs along the north end of the lake, connecting the two nearby areas of Sandane and Byrkjelo. The lake flows into the Gloppenelva river which flows into the Gloppefjorden, an arm of the Nordfjorden. Historically, the area surrounding the lake was part of the municipality of Breim, which existed from 1886 until 1964.

See also
List of lakes in Norway

References

External links
More information on Breimsvatn

Lakes of Vestland
Gloppen
Sunnfjord